All of You is a 2017 Philippine romantic comedy film directed by Dan Villegas and starring Jennylyn Mercado and Derek Ramsay. It is produced and released by Quantum Films, MJM Productions and serves as an official entry to the 2017 Metro Manila Film Festival.

The film revolves around two strangers who met each other through a mobile app.

In 2019, the film is now being streamed on Netflix as of January 19, 2019.

Cast
Jennylyn Mercado as Gabby
Derek Ramsay as Gab
Yayo Aguila
Kean Cipriano
Nico Antonio
Enzo Marcos
Via Antonio
Hannah Ladesma
Milo Elmido Jr.
Kelvin Yu
Sam Milby
Rafael Rosell
Solenn Heussaff

Release
The first trailer for All of You was released on November 15, 2017 which also featured a "Dying Inside" cover by Darren Espanto. The film had its commercial release on December 25, 2017 as one of the eight entries at the 2017 Metro Manila Film Festival.

Reception

Box office
All of You collected  of box office gross during the official run of the 2017 Metro Manila Film Festival. It is the sixth most sold film among eight entries during the film festival.

Critical response
Critic Fred Hawson whose review on All of You got republished by ABS-CBN News described the film as "generic" and "had nothing new to offer" remarking other recent films at that time romantic drama genre had a gimmick to make themselves stand out such as Kita Kita, 100 Tula Para Kay Stella, 12, Changing Partners. Hawson expressed his puzzlement of the fact that the film was given the Best Screenplay Award at the MMFF Awards though he commended the performances of Jennylyn Mercado and Derek Ramsay. Oggs Cruz of Rappler labeled the film as a "missed opportunity" and criticized the direction of the plot which he says "tries too hard to navigate a relationship towards a happy ending that just doesn’t feel justified" though he commended the performance of Mercado and Ramsay as well as the technical aspects of the film especially the lighting.

References

External links
 

Philippine romantic drama films